Statue of a Liberated Woman is a statue by Fuad Abdurahmanov. It was built in 1960 at the Public Square at the branching of Gurbanov and Cafar Cabbarli streets in Baku, Azerbaijan, and was inspired by the character of Sevil from the Jafar Jabbarly's play Sevil. The act of publicly removing the veil symbolizes transition of Azerbaijani women from seclusion to participation in Soviet society.

Background 
Fuad Aburahmanov, the designer of the statue stated: "The topic of emancipation of Azerbaijani women has attracted me for a long time. When I started work on the sculpture, for some reason I imagined an eagle that had become entangled in the net. She tears her bonds, finally, frees from them. One more moment, and it will soar into the sunny sky."

Veil as a part of woman’s wardrobe was the trait of all cities where trade was developing. The anti-veil movement was initially started in 1908 in Baku by liberal bourgeoisie well before the Soviet Hujum in 1927. However, the anti-veil protests were suppressed by Islamic clergy, causing a major setback. While some women stopped wearing the veil then, many still wore the veil out of social pressure.

A prominent Azeri women's organization based in Baku, the Ali Bayramov Club, actively participated in the campaign to encourage women to take off the veil.

After Azerbaijan became part of Soviet Union, the social status of women changed. As more women became employed, they dressed more often in work clothes instead of the veil. Public displays of anti-veil sentiments, which continued to face opposition from the clergy, regained momentum in 1920's with the implementation of the Hujum. It was not unusual for girls who stopped wearing the veil to be rejected by their family. Komsomol member Sara Khalilova was killed by her father for taking off the veil. The prominence of the statue reflects and honors the bravery and willpower of women who abandoned the veil.

Construction 
Fuad Abdurahmanov created the original statue from gypsum in 1951. The monument was restored in 1957 and recreated using bronze. The bronze statue was named “Liberty”  and was displayed at the exposition of the Museum of Arts. Several officials who saw the monument decided it would be moved to central Baku in honour of the 40th anniversary of the Soviet government. Abdurahmanov then began work on a larger version of the monument, which was completed in 1959 in the city of Leningrad where the bronze was cast; the finished statue was then transported back to Azerbaijan and placed on a tall pedestal.

See also
 Religion in Azerbaijan
 Hujum
Sevil
Azim Azimzade
Molla Nasraddin (magazine)

References 

Buildings and structures completed in 1960
Women's rights in Islam
Feminism in the Soviet Union
Sculptures in the Soviet Union
Anti-religious campaign in the Soviet Union
Sculptures of women in Azerbaijan
Outdoor sculptures in Azerbaijan
Statues in Baku
Sculptures by Fuad Abdurahmanov